The 2019 Redditch Borough Council elections took place on 2 May 2019 to elect members of Redditch Borough Council, a district-level local authority in Worcestershire, England.

Results

Ward results

Abbey

Astwood Bank & Feckenham

Batchley & Brockhill

Church Hill

Crabbs Cross

Greenlands

Headless Cross & Oakenshaw

Matchborough

West

Winyates

References

Redditch Borough Council election
2019
2010s in Worcestershire
May 2019 events in the United Kingdom